Actinopus dioi is a species of mygalomorph spiders in the family Actinopodidae. It can be found in Brazil.

The specific name dioi is in honor of heavy metal singer Ronnie James Dio.

References 

dioi
Spiders described in 2020
Spiders of Brazil